Aquilaria crassna is a species of plant in the Thymelaeaceae family. It is critically endangered and native to Southeast Asia.

Economics

Aquilaria crassna is one source of agarwood, a resinous heartwood, used for perfume and incense.  The resin is produced by the tree in response to infection by a parasitic ascomycetous mold, Phaeoacremonium parasitica, a dematiaceous (dark-walled) fungus.

References

crassna
Flora of Indo-China
Taxonomy articles created by Polbot